Mataasnakahoy, officially the Municipality of Mataasnakahoy,  is a 4th class municipality in the province of Batangas, Philippines. According to the 2020 census, it has a population of 30,621 people.

Mataasnakahoy was created through Executive Order No. 308 signed by George C. Butte, acting Governor General of the Philippines on March 27, 1931, effective January 1, 1932. Although the town's name is written as one word, it comes from the Tagalog phrase mataás na kahoy, which means "tall tree."

It is bounded by Balete and Lipa City with Taal Lake on its western edge.

Etymology 
The name of the municipality is explained in a May 1953 documented written by a commission composed of the town's schoolteachers.  According to them, the name "mataas na kahoy" dates from 1862, when the Capitan Municipal of Lipa first decided to establishment the settlement in that particular place as a barrio of Lipa. The head of the settlement recalled a tall tree - literally "mataas na kahoy" - which was in their settlement, and named the new barrio after it.

Geography
According to the Philippine Statistics Authority, the municipality has a land area of  constituting  of the  total area of Batangas.

Barangays
Mataasnakahoy is politically subdivided into 16 barangays.

Climate

Demographics

In the 2020 census, Mataasnakahoy had a population of 30,621.

Religion

The townsfolk are predominantly Roman Catholic, with minorities belonging to other religious groups like the Iglesia ni Cristo, United Methodist Church, Baptist denominations, Jehovah's Witnesses, Jesus is Lord Church and Members Church of God International.

Economy 

Its economy is primarily agricultural with coffee, coconut and banana as the major crops. Fish culture, with milkfish and tilapia being the major culture species, is also practiced in the coastal barangays of Nangkaan, Lumang Lipa and Kinalaglagan. Piggery and poultry farms from backyard to large scale operation represent a big part of the town's economy. Supporting the town's agribusiness are two feed mills namely, MAGICORP and AICOM.

Several banks (Mataasnakahoy Rural Bank, Lipa Development Bank, Savings and Loan Association of Mataasnakahoy) serve the townspeople. Small businesses like stores and groceries abound and the town center has a flea market (talipapa or tiangge) where fresh fish, meat and vegetables are available daily and a pharmacy, Generika Drugstore. Several small garment factories partly fuel the town's business activity. Telephone service and internet access are already available.

Residential development
Residential subdivisions (Victomar, Crisanta Homes, Immaculate Conception Village, Sinforosa and Monte Vista among others) have started real estate development in the town. Gawad Kalinga (a free house and lot project for the poor sponsored by the religious organisation Couples for Christ) is also established in Barangay Bubuyan.

Government

Elected officials
Municipal council (2019-2022):
 Mayor: Janet Magpantay Ilagan
 Vice Mayor: Jay Manalo Ilagan
 Councilors:
 Joseph S. Calinisan, Sr.
 Carmelita V. Acemiro
 Herwin D. Del Mundo
 Merlyn M. Caraan-Laqui
 Karen Joy A. Laqui
 Lemuel V. De Ocampo
 Angelito L. Subol

List of chief executive

Transportation

The town is easily accessible via Lipa City though passenger jeepneys plying the route from dawn (3:00 AM) till night (9:00 PM). It is also accessible via the national road through a two-kilometer concrete road along the southern boundary of Fernando Air Base. Tricycles are available for going around town and the innermost Barangays.

Tourism
Several resorts operate in different barangays and the town is starting to be known for these resorts. Shercon Resort, the first one which ventured in this line of business, is located in Barangay San Sebastian. Subsequently, El Madero in Barangay II and Galilee Place (Barangay San Sebastian) and La Virginia in Barangay Manggahan started operation.

Fiesta and religious celebrations
Mataasnakahoy celebrates its town fiesta every January 3. The series of activities leading to the celebration starts several days before the actual fiesta and this would consist of sporting events, singing contests, street dancing competitions and the likes. The actual feast would be observed with food (not to mention, alcoholic drinks) in almost every household. The celebration is almost a sort of annual reunion among relatives and friends. Marching bands, usually hired or sponsored by the barangay officials, go all over the town with their music adding to the already reverberating songs and sounds from rented videoke machines of some households. The celebration is usually concluded by a variety show in the town plaza with invited performers and popular names in the show business and this would usually last till early morning of the next day.

The town also celebrates various religious feasts with mass and processions. The Holy Week (week before Easter Sunday) is observed solemnly by the townsfolks. Religious families usually sponsor a "pabasa" which relates the passion of the Christ in hymns (in agonizing and melodramatic tempo) usually with loudspeakers. Several processions are also conducted within this week. Easter Sunday concludes this celebration.

All Saint's Day (November 1) is observed by throngs of people going to cemetery to visit the burial site of the departed relatives. Flowers, candles and prayers are brought to each burial site by the living relatives who are sometimes even coming from far places.

The feast of Our Lady of Immaculate Conception (December 8), the town's patron saint, is also a well observed celebration. There is usually a mass and a procession around town with elaborate fireworks. There will also be food in the church for the religious and the parishioners.

As is everywhere in the Philippines, the town celebrates a very long Christmas Season. This starts with the elaborate Christmas decorations being displayed as early as November 2 and lasting until early January. There will be lanterns, posters, Santa Claus, Christmas trees, Christmas lights and any decor imaginable helping to boost the festive atmosphere. On Christmas Day (December 25), kids will be going around asking for their godparents' and relatives' blessings which can also be interpreted as asking for Christmas gifts.

Education

The town is home to several secondary schools: La Purisima Concepcion Academy (Barangay II), Holy Trinity School of Padre Garcia, Bats., Mataasnakahoy Branch Inc. (Barangay IV), Mataasnakahoy National High School (Barangay IV), Bayorbor National High School (Bayorbor), Mataasnakahoy Senior High School (Bayorbor) and Mother Chiara Biagiotti School (Santol).

Notable personalities

 Gen. Efren L. Abu - former Chief of Staff of the Armed Forces of the Philippines
 Aga Muhlach - actor
 Darius Semaña - musician, lead guitarist of the band Parokya ni Edgar

References

External links

Mataasnakahoy official website
[ Philippine Standard Geographic Code]

Municipalities of Batangas
Populated places on Taal Lake
Establishments by Philippine executive order